The Merkur Funicular Railway is a metre gauge funicular railway in the town of Baden-Baden in Baden-Württemberg, Germany. The line ascends the town's Hausberg, the Merkur (668.3 m), atop which is the Merkur Tower.

The line opened in 1913 and closed in 1967. It was reopened on 27 April 1979.

The funicular has the following technical parameters:
Length: 
Height: 
Maximum steepness: 54%
Cars: 2
Capacity: 38 passengers per car
Track gauge: 
Traction: Electricity
Control: Automatic

See also 
 List of funicular railways

References

External links

 http://www.stadtwerke-baden-baden.de/stadtwerke/html/merkur_history.htm

Baden-Baden
Railway lines in Baden-Württemberg
Funicular railways in Germany
Metre gauge railways in Germany
Railway lines opened in 1913
1913 establishments in Germany